Post After Post-Mortem is a 1936 detective novel by E.C.R. Lorac, the pen name of the British writer Edith Caroline Rivett. It is the eleventh book featuring Chief Inspector MacDonald of Scotland Yard. Originally published by Collins Crime Club, it was reissued in 2022 by the British Library Publishing as part of a group of crime novels from the Golden Age of Detective Fiction.

Plot summary
With scores of treatises, reviews, and criminal novels published under family name, the Surrays and their five kids are a prolific writer family living at Upwood, Oxfordshire. Ruth, the middle sister, has, however, recently given her elder brother, Richard, some cause for concern. Richard, who has the trained eye of a psychiatrist, has seen that Ruth appears to be experiencing stress. Richard recommends to their mother that she may attempt to persuade Ruth to go on vacation with her because her most recent book has just been published and would undoubtedly receive the same critical praise as her earlier works. However, before this can take place, Ruth is discovered dead in her bedroom at her parents' house, complete with sleeping pills, a farewell letter, and a new will, all of which are strong indicators that she committed suscide. Following the inquest, which produces the anticipated result, Richard returns to his own house where he discovers a letter from Ruth that was written the evening of her passing but wasn't sent right away. In the letter, Ruth appears to be quite content and is making plans for the upcoming week. Although he'd like not to worry his family further, especially his mother. Inspector Macdonald of the Yard, a friend of Richard's, whom he feels compelled to share the letter to, agrees that there is cause to further examine Ruth's death as a result of the letter.

Inspector Macdonald is soon persuaded that Ruth's death was the result of murder and has a number of suspects to take into account. The family also comprises Ruth's parents, two brothers, and two sisters. At the time, three guys Ruth had invited to a modest home party were involved in her literary profession in some manner. On the surface, it would appear that the members of this happy family had no cause to murder a cherished sibling, but Macdonald has a sneaking suspicion that more than one of them is concealing something, maybe to save their mother further harm but possibly for sinister motives. The same is true of the three visitors; they are all reticent to provide Macdonald information that they believe may be relevant but that they believe would only damage Ruth's image and literary legacy. Being both a clever intellectual with much to say in her novels about the human condition and emotionally unsophisticated and even restrained in her private life, Ruth was somewhat of a paradox.

References

Bibliography
 Cooper, John & Pike, B.A. Artists in Crime: An Illustrated Survey of Crime Fiction First Edition Dustwrappers, 1920-1970. Scolar Press, 1995.
 Hubin, Allen J. Crime Fiction, 1749-1980: A Comprehensive Bibliography. Garland Publishing, 1984.
 Nichols, Victoria & Thompson, Susan. Silk Stalkings: More Women Write of Murder. Scarecrow Press, 1998.
 Reilly, John M. Twentieth Century Crime & Mystery Writers. Springer, 2015.

1936 British novels
British mystery novels
Novels by E.C.R. Lorac
Novels set in England
British detective novels
Collins Crime Club books